Torre La Sagrera also Sagrera Tower also Torre del Triangulo Ferroviario was a failed skyscraper project designed by Frank Gehry in Barcelona, Catalonia, Spain. It would have been 148 metres tall and had 34 floors, and would have become the third tallest building in Barcelona behind Torre Mapfre and Hotel Arts, and sixteenth tallest in Spain.

The building was to be located at the end of the Rambla de Prim (Railway Triangle Sagrera Sant Andreu), giving the streets of the Via Trajan, Josep Verneda Soldevila and the way in the future Barcelona Sagrera railway station is expected to be the largest of Spain. Next to the tower, which was planned to house offices, there will be a public park and a museum of transportation. The tower would have had construction costs of 250 million euros.

See also 
 List of tallest buildings and structures in Barcelona

References

External links

Frank Gehry buildings
Skyscraper hotels in Barcelona
Skyscraper office buildings in Barcelona